Vandana Singh is an Indian science fiction writer and physicist. She is an Associate Professor and Chair of the Department of Physics and Earth Science at Framingham State University in Massachusetts. Singh also serves on the Advisory Council of METI (Messaging Extraterrestrial Intelligence).

Works

Short fiction
 Ambiguity Machines and other stories includes previously unpublished "Requiem" (March 2018)
 The Woman Who Thought She Was A Planet and other stories includes two previously unpublished stories: "Conservation Laws" and "Infinities" (March 2009)
 "The Room on the Roof" in the anthology Polyphony (September 2002)
 "The Woman Who Thought She Was a Planet" in the anthology Trampoline (August 2003)
 "The Wife" in the anthology Polyphony (Volume 3)
Collected in Year's Best Fantasy and Horror (17)
 "Three Tales from Sky River: Myths for a Starfaring Age" in Strange Horizons (2004)
honorable mention in Year's Best Science Fiction (22) and Year's Best Fantasy and Horror (18)
 "Delhi" in the anthology So Long Been Dreaming (May 2004)
collected in Year's Best Science Fiction (22)
 "Thirst" in The 3rd Alternative (Winter 2004)
Longlisted for the British Fantasy Award
Honorable mention for Year's Best Science Fiction (22) and Year's Best Fantasy and Horror (18)
Collected in the anthology The Inner Line: Stories by Indian Women
 "The Tetrahedron" in Internova (2005)
Shortlisted for the Carl Brandon Parallax Award
Honorable mention in Year's Best Science Fiction (23)
 "The Sign in the Window" in the chapbook series Rabid Transit (May 2005)
 "Hunger" in the anthology Interfictions (April 2007)
 "Life-pod" in Foundation - The International Review of Science Fiction (August 2007)
 "Of Love and Other Monsters," a novella published in the Aqueduct Press's Conversation Pieces Series (October 2007)
 "Oblivion: A Journey" in the anthology Clockwork Phoenix (Summer 2008)
collected in Year's Best SF 14

Children's fiction
 Younguncle Comes to Town (March 2004)
 Younguncle in the Himalayas

Poetry
 "A Portrait of the Artist" in Strange Horizons (2003)
2nd place in 2004 Rhysling Prize for speculative poetry (long poem category)
 "Syllables of Old Lore" in the anthology Mythic (2006)
 "The Choices of Leaves" in the anthology Mythic (2006)

Notes

References

External links

 Official Website
 
 An Interview with Vandana Singh by Geoffrey H. Goodwin at Bookslut

Indian children's writers
Indian fantasy writers
Indian science fiction writers
Indian women children's writers
Living people
Year of birth missing (living people)
Women science fiction and fantasy writers
Indian women novelists
Women writers from Delhi
Novelists from Delhi
21st-century Indian women writers
21st-century Indian novelists